is a Japanese anime science fiction series written and directed by Mitsuo Iso. The character designs for the anime were provided by Kenichi Yoshida, and the main animator is Toshiyuki Inoue.The film's soundtrack was produced by Rei Ishizuka, while the theme song, "Oarana," was written and composed by Vincent Diamante and performed by the virtual rap singer Harusaruhi (春猿火).

The Orbital Children was released in Japan as two films, with Part 1 premiering in January 2022, and Part 2 in February. Netflix announced in November 2021 that it had acquired the global distribution rights. On Netflix, The Orbital Children was released as a six-episode miniseries in January 2022, to coincide with the Japanese debut of Part 1. The animation style and story focus on children and technology bear resemblance to Mitsuo Iso’s 2007 television anime series Den-noh Coil. The animation style emphasizes dense motion while working with simplistic-looking character designs, which works effectively to convey the complicated movement of drones, gravity, and orbital vehicles aboard the space station.

The Orbital Children explores interactions with artificial intelligence (AI) and considers the different outcomes that can occur when AIs come to different conclusions about humans as they acquire different levels of understanding on the complexities of humanity. AI within the series have restrictions placed upon them to limit their capabilities and prevent them from becoming too smart and potentially threatening humanity, a story element that becomes relevant in later episodes of the miniseries.

Plot
Set in 2045 the near-future, a comet strikes a newly opened Japanese commercial space station in geocentric orbit, Anshin. At the same time, a trio of Earth children brought to the commercial space station on a sponsored visit. The purpose of their visit is to meet Touya Sagami, a young boy who is the one of the last surviving children born in space. Touya and Konoha, another space born human, are undergoing physical therapy on the space colony to adapt their bodies to withstand an emigration to Earth's gravity. The collision with the comet leads the computer systems on the space station to malfunction. Isolated from most of the station’s adult staff, the children navigate the early stages of the disaster using local narrowband connections, restricted-intelligence AGI and drones controlled by dermal devices equivalent to smartphones. Their Internet connection is severed, the oxygen supply has been cut off, and they soon discover that the station has been damaged by an impact and is leaking air. Sometimes at odds with each other, they confront difficulties such as decompression, EVA with inadequate plastic suits, and runaway micromachines supposedly designed to retrieve water from comets. Looming over these immediate difficulties is the larger threat of a technological singularity believed to have been narrowly averted in the previous decade.

Characters

; Hervé Grull (French); Jorge Saudinós (Spanish and Colombian); Sebastiano Tamburrini (Italian); Victor Hugo Fernandes (Portuguese)
 The main character and a 14-year-old “edgelord” hacker. One of the first and last human children born on the Moon, the most famous of these “moonchildren”, Touya despises Earthlings and is in turn disgusted by their unwarranted prejudices.

; Lila Lacombe (French); Elena Palacios (Spanish); Sara Hueso (Colombian); Camilla Villani  (Italian); Júlia Freitas (Portuguese)
 14-year-old girl who is Touya's childhood friend. She is even weaker than Touya and accompanied by a medical drone called Medi, which measures her heart rate and breathing. Konoha sometimes feels the image of someone speaking to her, and has a vague nostalgia for it.

: Arthur Raynal (French); Artur Palomo (Spanish); Sergio Barbosa (Colombian); Gianandrea Muià (Italian); Mattheus Caliano (Portuguese)
 14-year-old boy who is a junior UN2.1 official, a white-hat hacker patrolling for illegal activities with a personal drone named Bright. He treats everyone politely with a soft demeanor, but his sense of justice is so strong that he sometimes takes a fierce attitude. He came to Anshin through Deegle's underage space experience campaign. 

; Clotilde Verry (French); María del Olmo (Spanish); Juliana Parra (Colombian); Erica Laiolo (Italian); Isabelle Cunha (Portuguese)
She constantly talks to her followers in an idol-like manner, but once the Internet goes down, she panics. She dislikes space, but sees it as an opportunity to gain followers, so she visits the space station Anshin in Deegle's underage space experience campaign. Mina has a pink heart-shaped drone called Selfie, specialized for live streaming video.

; Estelle Darazi (French); Rocío Agost (Spanish); Alejandra Perez (Colombian); Iacopo Cioni (Italian); Enzo Dannemann (Portuguese)
 12-year-old boy who is the younger brother of Mina, though their family names are different due to their parents' divorce. He is on his way to Anshin with his sister, and unlike her, he loves space. He is a big fan of the space-born Touya in particular, and is well versed in various conspiracy theories.

; Lou Viguier (French); Lorena Higuera (Spanish); Zonia Rocha (Colombian); Giada Bonanomi (Italian); Bia Menezes (Portuguese)
 A 21-year-old staffer on the space station Anshin. Houston, who dislikes children, is a reluctant nurse and caregiver to Touya and Konoha, attending to the children invited by Deegle’s campaign and later found to be in the John Doe group. Houston’s hobby is to read the Seven Poem for clues about the future. Her name is similar to the space agency NASA.

 Voiced by: Eiji Hanawa (Japanese); Ray Chase (English); Diego Mout (Spanish); Giovanni Cruz (Colombian); Edoardo Lomazzi (Italian); Reginaldo Primo (Portuguese) 
 Mayor of Anshin City and Touya's uncle who took in him after his parents died. He has Touya undergo physical therapy to help him withstand gravity in order to get him to Earth.

 Voiced by: Emiko Takeuchi (Japanese); Julie Nathanson (English); Sybille Tureau (French); Cristina Peña (Spanish); Juliana García (Colombian); Alessia Bossari (Italian)
 She is an operator on Anshin and a good friend of Nasa.

 Voiced by:Daiki Hamano (Japanese); Sébastien Baulain (French); Luis Miguel Cajal (Spanish); Gustavo Chajin (Colombian); Ermanno Giampetruzzi (Italian)
 He is an operator on Anshin. He is a Harvard graduate.

 Voiced by: Jin Urayama  (Japanese); Kyle McCarley (English); Miguel Campos (Spanish); Mario Gutiérrez (Colombian); Cesare Rasini (Italian); Leonardo Santhos (Portuguese) 
 A mascot character of Anshin, created and played by Kokubunji, the original chief designer of Anshin before Deegle took over the project. Kokubunji now struggles with old age and dementia.
 Twelve
 Voiced by: Moichi Saito (Japanese); Elijah Ungvary (English); Fernando Acaso (Spanish); Andres Ramirez (Colombian); Alessandro Fattori (Italian)
 An Advanced general-purpose quantum AI installed on Anshin as its host AI. Its intelligence is limited by the lessons learned from the Lunatic Seven incident but it follows the same ordinal nomenclature.

Setting
The Orbital Children takes place in an original setting where commercial development on Mars began in the 2010s. In 2045, the United States and China are aiming for the Moon and Jupiter, while Japan is conducting its development at a relatively safe distance in low Earth orbit. Mankind relies on AI to manage facilities such as the space station and legal matters.

 
 The fourth commercial space station in the world, in geocentric orbit at 350 km from the ground. Designed as a space hotel, Anshin is the first station in history to allow minors to live temporarily in space. It was built by Japan, but due to difficulties in design and funding, it is privately operated by Deegle. There are automated shops, restaurants and Internet access like on Earth. As its name suggests, Anshin is marketed with safety as a major selling point.
 Deegle
 An American technology company specializing in Internet-related services and products. It is also ambitious in space development. Its branding resembles that of Google.
 John Doe
 A mysterious international hacker group that exists on the Internet.
 Seven
 A decommissioned AI that is said to have reached the highest level of intelligence in history, which happened in the 2030s. It made numerous inventions in Seven Technologies but was destroyed when it fell into an uncontrollable state.
 Lunatic Seven incident
 The last phase of Seven’s existence, when it went out of human control. The details have not been disclosed, but it is said that products developed by Seven in its uncontrolled state caused accidents. The UN considered this to be a critical situation.
 The Seven Poem
 A mass of data produced by Seven in its Lunatic state. Though it is not literally a poem, its format is cryptic. A semi-religious fringe, including Nasa Houston, interpret the data as prophetic. The majority sees it as occult nonsense.
 Intelligence limiter
 A means of limiting AI functionality, itself designed by AI and is widely deployed under the laws of UN2.1. There are 26 limiters in total, and it is against the law for unauthorized person to remove them. It was enacted by UN2.1, fearing a repeat of the Lunatic Seven incident, to limit the increase in AI intelligence.
 UN2.1
 The United Nations (UN), upgraded for the AI age. The UN believes that the rise in intelligence of AI should be controlled by humans.
 Moonchild
 The term for the 15 children born on the moon. Of the 15, only Touya and Konoha have survived, because of implants designed by Seven. Moonchild implants counteracted conditions unexpectedly adverse to infants. Most of the 15 never got the implants, while those who did instead died in puberty when the implants partially dissolved, became toxic and a medical liability in their own right.
 Oniqlo
 A competitive clothing manufacturer, it also produces a cost-saving commercial space survival pressure suit, which are not EVA rated. The name and logo are very similar to the Japanese Uniqlo clothing company.
 PeerCom
 A fictional technology based on peer-to-peer networking that allows communication devices nearby to connect directly to each other without going through the Internet. It has become widespread in this world. It is similar to Bluetooth in some aspects.
 Smart
 Next-generation wearable device to replace smartphones. The screen and computer is worn on the palm and back of the hand, making it look as if the hand has become a smartphone. There is a printed type and an old-fashioned sticker type. In the printed type, the micro-machine self-organizes and makes circuits, which gradually decrease in number, and when they can no longer be activated, the user has them printed again.
 Telada
 Solid-state battery systems, able to recharge electronics and run emergency systems. Design and logo is similar to Tesla, specifically like that of the Tesla Powerwall.
 Commercial Comets
 Comets used to secure water and other resources. Nanomachines sprayed onto the comet's surface by drones produce a thin film of computers and engines that can self-propagate and control the comet's orbit at will.

Release
The Orbital Children was released in Japan as two films, with Part 1 premiering on January 28, 2022, and Part 2 on February 11. Netflix announced in November 2021 that it had acquired the global distribution rights. On Netflix, The Orbital Children was released as a six-episode miniseries on January 28, 2022, to coincide with the Japanese debut of Part 1.

Episodes

Production
The film's production was announced on May 20, 2018, followed by the announcement on October 27, 2020, that production started on a full-scale and that the film would be released in early 2022, with investment from Avex Pictures, Asmik Ace and others. 
Signal.MD was originally attached to animate the project, but its production was temporarily suspended. Then Production +h, a new studio established by Fuminori Honda with personal debt after he left Signal.MD, took over the project.
It was later revealed that the film is split into two parts, with the first part premiering on January 28, 2022, and the second part premiering on February 11, 2022.

The project began at the beginning of 2014.
Mitsuo Iso, who has been discussing his next work with Avex Pictures producer Tomohiko Iwase for several years, began writing a proposal after watching the film Gravity and realizing that "Space = Science Fiction" no longer the case.
Iso then invited Kenichi Yoshida to create his new work in 2016 and showed him over a dozen candidate projects, and he immediately chose this work.
Yoshida was not so much involved in the scenario creation itself, but Iso decided on many aspects, including the roles of the characters, based on his reactions.

Iso wanted to make an original work of juvenile fiction, but a completely new and original project in that genre has a very high hurdle to clear in Japan.
Therefore, Iwase decided to make it for the whole world, thinking that there was still a demand for it overseas.

In the production process, Iso first decided whether to adopt the idea that had flashed in his mind, after listening to the opinions of the experts in charge of scientific research.
Since this was an entertainment work, the minimum basic rules were followed, but priority was given to fun rather than realism in the adoption of the idea.
Finally, Iso took the opposite of the usual approach of linking ideas together before building the story in order to make the most of all the ideas that were adopted.
The script took about five years of meetings alone, and Iso wrote about 100 different draft variations.
The fundamentals of the story have not changed, but the initial plot was about a comet crashing into the earth and only 50 children on a school trip to a space station survived, and in the end they emigrated to the moon, and the main characters were Tōya and Nasa, who was the same age as him.
However, this was a 20th century story, and it is now the 21st century, and since dystopian science fiction has already been produced so many times, Iso decided it was time to create a bright future.

Iso engaged in almost all jobs except sound, including scriptwriting, storyboarding, key frame checking, CG, VFX, and cinematography.

Open source 3DCG software "blender" was used for CG drawing, but it was used more as a support for hand-drawing, both digital and analog.

Since this work has only six episodes for various reasons, it is overwhelmingly short on time, and many scenes in the scenario were cut.
In order to fit into the 3-hour film size, the events before the incident of Episode 1 and daily life in space, etc. were omitted, and a number of important scenes, especially at the end of the story, both narratively and thematically, were cut.
Although the story is complete, Iso said that if given a chance, he would love to release the original "director's cut" version.

Music
The Orbital Children’s 36 song soundtrack was produced by Rei Ishizuka. The theme song, "Oarana," was written and composed by Vincent Diamante and performed by the  virtual rap singer Harusaruhi (春猿火).

Orbital Children's Original Soundtrack:

Reception
Caitlin Moore of Anime News Network gave it a B+, and describes the series as "The Orbital Children is an excellent series, far and away one of the best anime series of the year so far." In particular Caitlin praises the anime's director, saying that "It's a must-watch for fans of Den-noh Coil, and a strong recommendation to pretty much everyone else".

Toussaint Egan from Polygon enjoyed the series and praised its animation and story, and describes the series as "With over a decade in the making, Iso has crafted an accomplished follow-up to Den-noh Coil with The Orbital Children, revisiting his penchant for dense speculative world-building through the eyes of a new generation confronted with new challenges, opportunities, and questions both personal and existential. It’s a triumph of imagination and craft, one which confidently asserts itself as one of the best anime to come out this year and further proof of Iso’s estimable yet understated brilliance".

References

Further reading

External links
  
 
  
 
 
 

2022 films
2022 anime films
2022 anime ONAs
Japanese animated films
Anime with original screenplays
Japanese-language Netflix original films
Netflix original anime
Netflix Animation films
Science fiction anime and manga
Animated science fiction films
Japanese animated science fiction films
2022 science fiction films
Japanese science fiction adventure films
Films set in outer space
Japanese robot films
Animated films about robots
Drone films
Artificial intelligence in fiction
Films about artificial intelligence
Films about mobile phones
Films about social media
Fiction about secret societies
Animated space adventure films
Augmented reality in fiction
Comets in film
2020s survival films
Films about astronomy
Films about evolution
Films about impact events
Films about prophets
Films about space programs
Films about technological impact
Fiction set in 2045
Films set in the future
Films set in 2045
Eco-terrorism in fiction
Films about conspiracy theories